William Woodbridge (August 20, 1780October 20, 1861) was a U.S. statesman in the states of Ohio and Michigan and in the Michigan Territory prior to statehood. He served as the second governor of Michigan and a United States Senator from Michigan.

Early life in Connecticut and politics in Ohio
Woodbridge was born in Norwich, Connecticut. Through an entirely paternal line he was a direct descendant of English Puritan John Woodbridge. As a child moved with his family to Marietta, Ohio, in about 1790. He began the study of law in Marietta and developed a close friendship with Lewis Cass. He returned to Connecticut to complete his law studies, and after returning to Ohio, was admitted to the Ohio bar in 1806 where he began a practice in Marietta, Ohio. In June 1806, he married Juliana Trumbull, the daughter of John Trumbull.

He was a member of the Ohio House of Representatives in 1807, and was elected to the Ohio Senate in 1808, serving from 1809 to 1814. He was also the prosecuting attorney for New London (now Washington County, Ohio) from 1808 to 1814.

Politics in Michigan Territory
In 1814, Woodbridge's old friend Lewis Cass, who had become Governor of the Michigan Territory, encouraged him to accept appointments as Secretary of the Territory and as the collector of customs at the Port of Detroit. On October 15, 1814, Woodbridge reluctantly accepted the appointments from President James Madison and moved to Detroit, Michigan. During the frequent absences of Cass, Woodbridge served as acting governor. In 1817, Woodbridge became a trustee of the University of Michigan.

Under the rules of territorial government, the territory did not have representation in the U.S. Congress. Woodbridge influenced Congress to pass legislation authorizing the selection of a non-voting delegate to Congress. Woodbridge became the Michigan Territory's first delegate, serving in the 16th Congress from March 4, 1819, to his resignation on August 9, 1820, due to illness in his family. Solomon Sibley succeeded Woodbridge as delegate. He remained the Territorial Secretary while delegate.

As a delegate, Woodbridge worked for the passage of legislation that recognized old French land titles in the territory according to the terms of the previously signed treaties. He also secured approval for the construction of government roads from the Great Miami River to Detroit, and from Detroit to Chicago. He was also a strong advocate for Michigan's claim to the Toledo Strip, which was disputed with the state of Ohio.

In 1828, he was appointed one of three Territorial Supreme Court justice by President John Quincy Adams, succeeding James Witherell and serving in this capacity until 1832 when his term expired and President Andrew Jackson chose a replacement who was not from the Whig Party as Woodbridge was.

Politics and Governorship in the State of Michigan
Woodbridge was a delegate to the state constitutional convention in 1835 and a member of the Michigan State Senate from 1838 to 1839. He was elected as the second Governor of Michigan in 1840, leading the Whig Party to sweeping statewide victories under the slogan "Woodbridge and reform" (along with William Henry Harrison's national campaign). He resigned as governor on February 23, 1841, to take a seat in the United States Senate and was succeeded by his Lieutenant Governor, J. Wright Gordon.

Woodbridge was elected to the Senate by the Michigan Legislature and served from March 4, 1841 to March 3, 1847. He was only one of two Whig Senators who represented Michigan, alongside Augustus S. Porter whom he served with for most of his term. Woodbridge served as chairman of the Committee on Public Lands in the 28th Congress from 1843 to 1844, and of the Committee on Patents and the Patent Office in the 29th Congress from 1845 to 1846.  He did not seek reelection.

Retirement and death
After leaving the Senate, he retired from public life and devoted his time to horticulture. He died in Detroit and is interred there in Elmwood Cemetery.

The following bear his name:
Woodbridge Township, Michigan, in Hillsdale County, Michigan
The Woodbridge Historic District and Woodbridge Avenue in Detroit
Woodbridge Elementary School in the Zeeland, Michigan Public School district

References

Benjamin Harrison and Governor Woodbridge

Political Graveyard
memorial library 

1780 births
1861 deaths
Governors of Michigan
Justices of the Michigan Supreme Court
Delegates to the United States House of Representatives from Michigan Territory
United States senators from Michigan
Ohio lawyers
Ohio Whigs
Michigan state senators
Ohio state senators
Members of the Ohio House of Representatives
Regents of the University of Michigan
American Congregationalists
Politicians from Marietta, Ohio
Michigan Democratic-Republicans
Michigan Whigs
Whig Party United States senators
Burials at Elmwood Cemetery (Detroit)
Whig Party state governors of the United States
Delegates to the 1835 Michigan Constitutional Convention
19th-century American judges
19th-century American lawyers
19th-century American politicians